The Confederate Soldiers Martyrs Monument in Eminence, Kentucky, notes the burial spot of three Confederate prisoners who were shot while imprisoned.  The names of the victims were William Datbor (Darbro), William Tighe, and R. W. Yates.  It was done in retaliation for the killing of two unarmed African-Americans and authorized by Union General Burbridge's Order 59, which allowed for the execution of Confederate soldiers even if they were not directly involved in the earlier execution.

It was placed on the National Register of Historic Places on July 17, 1997, one of sixty Kentucky Civil War monuments placed on the Register on the same day.

Description

The monument is a seven foot high white marble obelisk and rests on a marble base that is approximately two feet wide. The boundary forms a circle with a radius of ten feet.

Inscriptions
There are inscriptions on two faces of the monument. They read:

Three CSA Soldiers who were shot Nov 3 1864, at Pleasureville by order of Gen Burbridge in pretense of retaliation of two Negras that were killed near Port Royal; Sleep on ye braves for you have got our sympathy to our latest breath. We would not have three buried on a lot with him who caused thy death.

William Tighe aged 30 years, R W Yates aged 30 years, William Datbor aged 20 years.

Gallery

References

 https://web.archive.org/web/20070505002912/http://johnhuntmorgan.scv.org/martyrs.htm

External links

Civil War Monuments of Kentucky MPS
National Register of Historic Places in Henry County, Kentucky
Martyrs' monuments and memorials
Confederate States of America monuments and memorials in Kentucky
1870 sculptures
Obelisks in the United States
1870 establishments in Kentucky